Muğan may refer to:
Muğan Gəncəli, Azerbaijan
Muğan, Bilasuvar, Azerbaijan
Muğan, Hajigabul, Azerbaijan
Muğan, Jalilabad, Azerbaijan

See also
Mugan (disambiguation)
Muğanlı (disambiguation)